Buca Koop., short for Buca Kooperatif Evleri, is a proposed underground station on the Üçyol—Çamlıkule Line of the İzmir Metro. It will be located beneath 1401 Street in southeast Buca. Construction of the station, along with the metro line, is expected to begin in 2020. Buca Koop. was the original eastern terminus of the line until August 2016, when the line was extended one station further to Çamlıkule. 

Buca Koop. station is expected to open in 2024.

References

İzmir Metro
Railway stations scheduled to open in 2024
Rapid transit stations under construction in Turkey